Palvai Govardhan Reddy (20 November 1936 – 9 June 2017) was an Indian politician from the Indian National Congress Party and formerly representing the Telangana State as a Member of Parliament (Rajya Sabha).

He completed B.A. at Vivekavardhini College, Osmania University.

He was member of Andhra Pradesh Legislative Assembly during the terms 1967–72, 1972–78, 1978–83, 1983–85 and 1999–2004. During 2007-09 he was Member of the Andhra Pradesh Legislative Council.

Life
Palvai Govardhan Reddy was born in Nadimpally village, Achampet Mandal, Mahabubnagar district of Telangana on 20 November, 1936 to Anasuyamma and Ranga Reddy. He visited his Maternal Grandfather's house, swam in the Dindi River and walked to Kamsanapally village.

He studied till 2nd standard at home in Bangarugadda village, Chandur Mandal Nalgonda district. Having no schooling facilities in his village, he moved to his maternal uncle's village Sivannagudem village, Marriguda mandal Nalgonda to complete his education. Due to the Razakar Movement, he had to keep on moving to complete his schooling. He later settled in Hyderabad in 1951 and studied in St. Mary's High School. He studied in Urdu Medium until 5th Standard and later in Telugu Medium. Reddy completed his Intermediate and Graduation from Viveka Vardhani College, Hyderabad. He continued at Viveka Vardhini College in Bachelor of Arts and passed in 1967, the same year he contested as MLA for the first time.

Personal life
He was married to Srujamani in 1962 in Hyderabad, the only daughter of Sarojanamma and late Narayana Reddy residents of Ledalla village, Atmakur Mandal, Warangal district. They had three children Sravan Kumar Reddy (1971), Sravanthi (1973) and Dr Shanthan Reddy (1976).

Death 
He died of a cardiac arrest on 9 June 2017 when he was on his way to attend a Parliamentary Standing Committee meeting in Kullu Himachal Pradesh.

His Interests 
 Irrigation
 Drinking water
 Agriculture, Horticulture and Sericulture
 Public Industries 
 Culture
 Arts and Handicrafts

He was the authority on River water management and water sharing and storage was a major interest. He prepared detailed project reports on Krishna and Godavari river water storage and utilisation. He was a staunch opponent of Pulichintala and Polavaram projects as he believed they never served any purpose for the barren areas of Telangana.

References

 

1936 births
2017 deaths
Indian National Congress politicians from Telangana
Rajya Sabha members from Andhra Pradesh
Rajya Sabha members from Telangana
Telugu politicians
Indian National Congress politicians from Andhra Pradesh